Maiana is a parliamentary constituency electing two representatives to the House of Assembly of Kiribati. It encompasses the atoll of the same name in the Gilbert Islands.

The Maiana constituency has existed since the First Parliament in 1979. At that time, it elected only one representative. Its inaugural MP was Bwebwetake Areieta.

Currently, it is the constituency of the present President of Kiribati, Dr Anote Tong.

Members of Parliament by year
The following MPs have represented Maiana in the House of Assembly, since the seat was created in 1979.

References

Kiribati parliamentary constituencies
1979 establishments in Kiribati
Constituencies established in 1979